Vi Institute of Technology is an engineering college in Chengalpattu, Tamil Nadu, India. The college is affiliated with Anna University, Chennai and has been approved by the All India Council for Technical Education.

History
Vi Institute of Technology, a part of Vi Microsystems Pvt. Ltd. The College was founded in 2009 by Viit's Chairman R.Vijayarajeswaran.

Courses
UG Courses
 B.E - Civil Engineering
 B.E - Mechanical Engineering
 B.E - Electrical and Electronics Engineering
 B.E - Electrical and Communication Engineering
 B.E - Computer Science and Engineering

PG Courses
M.E - Embedded Systems Technologies

References

External links

Engineering colleges in Tamil Nadu
Colleges affiliated to Anna University
Universities and colleges in Kanchipuram district
Educational institutions established in 2009
2009 establishments in Tamil Nadu